Parafreutreta retisparsa is a species of tephritid or fruit flies in the genus Parafreutreta of the family Tephritidae.

Distribution
South Africa.

References

Tephritinae
Insects described in 1939
Diptera of Africa